Paronymus ligora, the largest dart, is a butterfly in the family Hesperiidae. It is found in Guinea, Sierra Leone, Ivory Coast, Ghana, Togo, Nigeria, Cameroon, Gabon, the Central African Republic, Angola, the Democratic Republic of the Congo and Uganda. The habitat consists of forests.

References

Butterflies described in 1876
Erionotini
Butterflies of Africa
Taxa named by William Chapman Hewitson